Jose Pellissery (1950 – 5 December 2004) was an Indian film and theatre actor.

Biography
As an actor in Malayalam cinema, he played supporting roles in about 100 films.  His 15-year film career included roles in such movies as Aadhaaram, Akashadoothu, Naadody, and Ghazal.

Pellissery was a partner of the theatre company Chalakudy Sarathy Theatres.  He performed in about a dozen plays produced by this company under the direction of Thilakan, including Five Star Hospital, Alakal, Indhanam, Fassahu, Mochanam Nale, Adisankaran Janicha Naattil, and Chamayam.

Pellissery also acted in a number of Malayalam TV serials, such as Chitta, Meghanidhi, and Kayamkulam Kochunni.

Pellissery died at a private hospital in Chalakudy on 5 December 2004, following a heart attack. He was 54. He is survived by his wife Lilly, son Lijo Jose Pellissery and a daughter, (Lijomol Jose Pallissery). His son, Lijo Jose Pellissery, is a prominent director in the modern Malayalam cinema movement and is often quoted as "one of the best directors working in the industry at present".

Awards

 Kerala State Award for the Best Stage Actor - Fassahu

Filmography

 Junior Senior (2005) as Varma
 Vellinakshatram (2004) as Indu's father
 Pulival Kalyanam (2003) as Swamy
 Leader (2003) as Minister
 Varum Varunnu Vannu (2003)
 Sadanante Samayam (2003)
 Malsaram (2003)
 Melvilasam Sariyanu (2003) as Gokuldas
 Kalyanaraman (2002)
 Chathurangam (2002) as Devasya
 Desam (2002)
 Mazhathullikilukkam (2002)
 Bheri (2002)
 Grand Mother (2002)
 Pranyamanithooval (2002) as Principal
 Thilakam (2002) as Shankunny Nair
 Dhosth (2001)
 Fort Kochi (2001)
 Mazhamegha Pravukal (2001)
 Malavika (2001)
 Pranayamanthram (2001)
 Kattuvannu Vilichappol (2001) as Sankara Pillai
 Dupe Dupe Dupe (2001)
 Nakshathrangal Parayathirunnathu (2001)
 Pranayaaksharangal (2001)
 Praja (2001) as priest
 Darling Darling (2000) as Doctor
 Priyankari (2000)
 Rapid Action Force (2000) as Minister
 Dreams (2000)
 Nadan Pennum Nattu Pramaniyum (2000)
 Rakkilikal (2000)
 India Gate (2000) as Settu
 Maduranombarakattu (2000)
 Mele Varyathe Malakhakuttikal (2000)
 Kattu vannuvilichapol (2001)
 Aayiram Meni (1999) as Kuriachan
 Garshom (1999) as Varghese
 Captain (1999) as Antony
 English Medium (1999)
 Amma Ammayiamma (1998) as Sanku
 Harikrishnans (1998)
 Gloria Fernandus From USA (1998)
 Pranayavarnagal (1998)
 Chenapparambile Aanakkariyam (1998) as Manickyamangalathu Ramunni Menon
 Mayajalam (1998) as Paramu Menon
 Samaantharangal (1998) as Financier
 Sreekrishnapurathe Nakshathrathilakkam (1998) as Ramkumar
 Vismayam (1997) as Kochu Krishnan
 Hitler Brothers (1997) as Sankarankutty
 Janathipathyam (1997) as Eeppachan
 Kalyana Unnikal (1997) as Parakkal Avarachan
 Nagarapuranam (1997) as Pankajakshan
 Newspaper Boy (1997)
 Anuboothi (1997)
 Kudamattom (1997)
 The Good Boys (1997) as Kurup
 Kaliveedu (1996)
 Sathyabhaamaykkoru Pranayalekhanam (1996)
 Kanchanam (1996) as Pattar
 Hitlist (1996) as Soofikutty
 Kathil Oru Kinnaram (1996) as R.P Menon
 Dilliwala Rajakumaran (1996) as Krishna Murthy
 Mookkilla Rajyathu Murimookkan Rajavu (1996) 
 Aksharam (1995) as Minister's Secretary
 Kusruthikaatu (1995) as College Principal
 Kalyanji Anandji (1995)
 Sargavasantham (1995) as Joy's father
 Special Squad (1995) as Adv Shivadasa Menon 
 No. 1 Snehtheeram Bangalore North (1995)
 Mangalam Veettil Manaseswari Gupta (1995) as Sahadevan
 Vrudhanmare Sookshikkuka (1995) as Novelist
 Kudumba Visesham (1994) as Kunjappu
 Malappuram Haji Mahanaya Joji (1994)
 Manathe Vellitheru (1994) as Merlin's Manager
 Chief Minister K R Gouthami (1994)
 The Porter (1994) as Kunjunni Kuruppu
 Varanamaalyam (1994) as MLA
 Palayam (1994) as Mathai
 Chukkan (1994) as Manjooran
 Aagneyam (1993) as Rappayi
 Akashadoothu (1993)
 Samooham (1993) as Sukumaran Nair
 Ponnuchami (1993)
 Porutham (1993) as Shivasankaran 
 Ghoshayathra (1993) as Kumaran
 Injakkadan Mathai & Sons (1993) as Kuriachan
 Janam (1993) as C. M. Nair
 Samagamam (1993) as Enashu
 Aadhaaram (1992) as Lazar
 Ayalathe Addeham (1992) as Joseph
 Champakkulam Thachan (1992) as Vakkachan
 Grihaprevesam (1992) as Lawyer
 My Dear Muthachan (1992) as Lawyer at the courthouse
 Naadody (1992)
 Cheppadividya (1992)
 Savidam (1992)
 Soorya Gayathri (1992) as Kuriakose
 Karpporadeepam (1991)
 Maala Yogam (1990) as Man at the Church

TV Serial
 Pettamma
 Manalanagaram

References

External links
 
 Jose Pallisseri at MSI

Male actors from Kerala
1950 births
2004 deaths
People from Chalakudy
Male actors in Malayalam cinema
Indian male film actors
20th-century Indian male actors
21st-century Indian male actors
Male actors from Thrissur
Male actors in Malayalam television